Pocket sandwich is a sandwich which is made using a single piece of folded or hollowed bread, such as a pita, which is made from dough cooked with fillings inside.

Types of pocket sandwiches
 Hot Pockets
 Fougasse
 Calzone
 Stromboli
 Pita
 Runza
 Pepperoni roll
 Pizza rolls
 Hot dogs
 McStuffins: a form of the pocket sandwich served at McDonald's in 1993

Shelf-stable pocket sandwiches

The US Army has developed shelf-stable pocket sandwiches as combat feeding rations (the First Strike Ration) for its troops on-the-go.  The sandwiches are engineered to prevent microbial growth through the use of specialized water treatment, acidic content (naturally, through ingredient selection; or by the addition of food-grade acids), special multi-layer foil packaging, and oxygen-absorbing packets.

See also
 Finger food
 List of sandwiches
 List of stuffed dishes

References

Sandwiches
Stuffed dishes